Sauripterus ("lizard wing") is a genus of rhizodont lobe-finned fish that lived during the Devonian period (416-360.7 Ma).
This genus was described by J. Hall after its discovery at Powy's Curve in Pennsylvania.

References  

Prehistoric lobe-finned fish genera
Devonian fish of North America
Rhizodonts